Cacostola rugicollis is a species of beetle in the family Cerambycidae. It was described by Henry Walter Bates in 1885. It is known from Guatemala, Honduras and Mexico.

References

Cacostola
Beetles described in 1885